Ho Chol-man is a North Korean politician. At the 5th Plenary Meeting of the 7th Central Committee of the WPK held on December 31, 2019, he was elected as a candidate (alternate) member of the Politburo of the Workers' Party of Korea.

References

Living people
Year of birth missing (living people)
Place of birth missing (living people)
Alternate members of the 8th Politburo of the Workers' Party of Korea
Members of the 8th Central Committee of the Workers' Party of Korea